The Naviglio Grande is a canal in Lombardy, northern Italy, connecting the Ticino river near Tornavento ( south of Sesto Calende) to the Porta Ticinese dock, also known as the Darsena, in Milan.

History

The Naviglio Grande was the most important of the Milanese “navigli”. Probably originating as a ditch dug in 1157 between Abbiategrasso and  Landriano as a defense against Frederick Barbarossa, it was one of the largest medieval engineering projects, allowing development of commerce, transport and agriculture.

In 1177, construction began near Tornavento, but problems stopped work almost immediately. In 1179 however, a dam was constructed and water from the Ticino was directed towards Turbigo, Castelletto di Cuggiono, Bernate and Boffalora reaching Gaggiano in 1233. This  section, the  “Navigium de Gazano” took over 50 years to dig by hand using only pickaxe and shovel. Prisoners from Turbigo were put to work in 1239 to increase the carrying capacity of the canal.

In 1258, the Naviglio Grande reached Milan. New taxes were levied to continue the digging, and although the work stopped again following opposition from the citizens and clergy, the whole canal was navigable from 1272, when the deepening and widening of the canal bed was completed by Giacomo Arribotti and the canal reached the bridge of Sant'Eustorgio (now Porta Ticinese).

Although intended mostly for irrigation, pontoons called cobbie quickly began using the canal to take salt, grain, wine, manufactured goods, fabric, tableware, manure  and ash upriver to Lake Maggiore and Switzerland, bringing back livestock, cheese, hay, coal, lumber, sand, marble and granite. The small lake of Sant'Eustorgio was linked to the Fossa Interna (also known as the Cerchia Interna or Inner Ring) of Milan using  a new system of two locks to control the water level, thereby allowing boats to reach Piazza Santo Stefano. This was to allow the canal to be used in transporting stone and marble for the Duomo, whose construction started in 1386. This confirmed the canal to be the most valuable form of transport of Milan, and proved that the network could be expanded to serve the whole region, especially in transferring troops rapidly between defensive castles.

It peaked again during the second world war – with Allied planes bombing road and rail, water transport again became useful for transporting goods. The surge in activity continued after the war - in 1953 Porta Ticinese dock was the 13th largest in the country in terms of goods received. However, an increase in the value of goods and strong interests supporting road transport caused a rapid decline. During the sixties, the Fossa Interna was covered over and on March 30th 1979 the last cargo of sand was unloaded at the Darsena. Since then the canal has been used only for its original purpose, irrigation.

Recently the Istituto per i Navigli has been campaigning for the return of navigation on the canal. The project, called From Switzerland to the Sea promotes the restoration of the canal as part of a long distance waterway linking Lake Maggiore (partly in Switzerland) to Venice (Italy).

External links

 Associazione Navigli Live 
 Istituto per i Navigli / Associazione Amici dei Navigli 
 The complete text of the book "I Navigli Milanesi" published by Silvana  
 Galleria fotografica mostly photos of the 'Darsena' (the old docks in Milan)

Geography of Milan
Canals in Lombardy
Waterways of Italy
Transport in Lombardy
Canals opened in 1272